is a Nippon Professional Baseball pitcher for the Yokohama DeNA BayStars in Japan's Central League.

External links

1979 births
Asian Games medalists in baseball
Baseball players at the 2002 Asian Games
Japanese baseball players
Living people
Saitama Seibu Lions players
Seibu Lions players
Baseball people from Osaka Prefecture
Yokohama BayStars players
Yokohama DeNA BayStars players
Asian Games bronze medalists for Japan
Medalists at the 2002 Asian Games
People from Higashiōsaka